Alain De Ruyter (born 5 May 1969) is a Belgian short track speed skater. He competed in two events at the 1992 Winter Olympics.

References

External links
 

1969 births
Living people
Belgian male short track speed skaters
Olympic short track speed skaters of Belgium
Short track speed skaters at the 1992 Winter Olympics
Sportspeople from West Flanders